Abu Snan is a local council in the Galilee region of northern Israel, with an area of 4,750 dunams (4.75 km²). It achieved recognition as an independent local council in 1964. It is a religiously mixed town, with a Muslim majority and sizable Druze and Christian minorities.

History
Abu Snan is an ancient village site, where old dressed stones have been reused in modern houses. Graves, oil or vine -presses, and cisterns have been found cut in rock.

Crusaders
In about 1250 Abu Snan is noted as a casale of the Teutonic Knights, called Busnen.  Under the name Tusyan, probably a corruption of Busenan, Abu Snan was mentioned as part of the domain of the Crusaders during the hudna between the Crusaders based in Acre and the Mamluk sultan al-Mansur (Qalawun) declared in 1283. No Crusader remains have yet been identified in the village.

Ottoman Empire
In 1517, Abu Snan was with the rest of Palestine incorporated into the Ottoman Empire after it was captured from the Mamluks, and by 1596, it  appeared in the Ottoman tax registers as part of the Nahiya of Akka of the Liwa of Safad.  It had a population of 102 households and 3 bachelors, all  Muslims. The villagers paid taxes on wheat, barley, olive trees, sesame, cotton, goats and beehives, in addition to "occasional revenues"; a total of 7,600 akçe.

A map by Pierre Jacotin  from Napoleon's invasion of 1799 showed the place, named as Abou Senan. When French explorer Victor Guérin visited  the village in 1875, he estimated  the population of Abu Snan to be 400, of whom 260 were Druzes and  140 Greek Orthodox Christians. Guérin also wrote that "Abu Senan has succeeded an ancient town, as is proved by cisterns cut in rock, and a considerable quantity of cut-stones, now used for modern buildings." Fragments from an older building is used in a chapel for St. George.

In 1881, the Palestine Exploration Fund's Survey of Western Palestine described Abu Snan as a stone-built village situated on the low hill near the plain, surrounded by olive groves and arable land, and with many  cisterns of rain-water. The population consisted of 150 Christians and 100 Muslims.

A population list from about 1887 showed that   Abu Senan had about 565 inhabitants;  two thirds Druze, one third Greek Catholic Christians.

British Mandate

In the 1922 census of Palestine, conducted  by the British Mandate authorities, Abu Snan had a total population of 518. Of these, 43 were Muslim, 228 Druzes and  247 Christians. Of Abu Snan's 247 Christians, 196 were Orthodox, 44 Roman Catholics, 4 Melkites and 3 Maronites. In  the 1931 census it had increased to a  population of 605, in 102 inhabited houses. Of  these, 20 were Muslim, 274 Christians, and 311 Druzes.

In the   1945 statistics the population of Abu Snan was 820; 30 Muslims, 380 Christians and 410 other Arabs, and the land area was   a total of  13,043 dunams, according to an official land and population survey. 2,172 dunams were plantations and irrigable land, 7,933 used for cereals, while 69 dunams were built-up (urban) land.

Israel 
In 2003 the local council was merged with its neighboring towns. The next year this was undone.

Demographics
Abu Snan had a population of 13,000 (2014), 7,000 of whom are Muslim, 4,000 Druze, and 2,000 Christian.

Income
According to Israel's Central Bureau of Statistics, the town had a low ranking (3 out of 10) on the country's socioeconomic index (December 2001). Only 63.6% of students earn a matriculation certificate at the end of Grade 12 (2000). The average salary that year was NIS 3,629 per month, whereas the national average was NIS 6,835.

See also
Arab localities in Israel
Druze in Israel

References

Bibliography

External links
 Welcome To Abu Sinan
Survey of Western Palestine, Map 3:  IAA, Wikimedia commons 

Arab localities in Israel
Local councils in Northern District (Israel)
Druze communities in Israel
Arab Christian communities in Israel